Norbert "Norb" Schemansky (May 30, 1924 – September 7, 2016) was an American weightlifter. He was the first weightlifter to win four Olympic medals, despite missing the 1956 Summer Olympics due to back problems. He won a silver medal in the 1948 Summer Olympic Games, a gold in the 1952 Summer Olympics and bronzes in the 1960 and 1964 Summer Olympics.

Biography
Schemansky was a three-time world champion and a Pan American and Olympic games gold medalist. During his long weightlifting career (1947–1972) he set 13 official and 11 unofficial world records. On April 28, 1962, at the age of 37 years and 333 days, Schemansky became the oldest man in the history of weightlifting to set an official world record, when he snatched 164 kg. In 1997 Schemansky was inducted into the International Weightlifting Federation Hall of fame. In 1979, he was inducted into the National Polish-American Sports Hall of Fame. He was born and raised in Detroit and from 1959 until his death in 2016 lived in Dearborn, Michigan, where a city park was named for him. Prior to his years of Olympic weightlifting competition, Schemansky served in World War II with the 184th Anti-Aircraft Artillery Battalion and fought at the Battle of the Bulge. Schemansky died in Dearborn on September 7, 2016, at the age of 92, while in hospice care.

References

External links 

 Image of Norbert Schemansky training for the1964 Olympics, 1964. Los Angeles Times Photographic Archive (Collection 1429). UCLA Library Special Collections, Charles E. Young Research Library, University of California, Los Angeles.

1924 births
2016 deaths
United States Army personnel of World War II
American strength athletes
American male weightlifters
Weightlifters at the 1948 Summer Olympics
Weightlifters at the 1952 Summer Olympics
Weightlifters at the 1960 Summer Olympics
Weightlifters at the 1964 Summer Olympics
Olympic gold medalists for the United States in weightlifting
Olympic silver medalists for the United States in weightlifting
Olympic bronze medalists for the United States in weightlifting
Sportspeople from Detroit
American people of Polish descent
Medalists at the 1948 Summer Olympics
Medalists at the 1952 Summer Olympics
Medalists at the 1960 Summer Olympics
Medalists at the 1964 Summer Olympics
Pan American Games gold medalists for the United States
Pan American Games medalists in weightlifting
People associated with physical culture
Weightlifters at the 1955 Pan American Games
World Weightlifting Championships medalists
Medalists at the 1955 Pan American Games